Miss Belvedere is a 1957 Plymouth Belvedere that was sealed in an underground vault on the grounds of the Tulsa city courthouse on June 15, 1957, as a 50-year time capsule.

The car, a desert gold and sand dune white two-tone sport coupe which displayed only four miles on its odometer, was entombed as part of the city of Tulsa's "Tulsarama" Golden Jubilee Week festivities celebrating Oklahoma's 50th year of statehood. The unnamed vehicle was intended to be a prize awarded upon the vehicle's unearthing to the individual, or their descendant, who came nearest to guessing Tulsa's population in 2007. A matching automobile had been awarded in a separate contest a few days prior.

Nicknamed Miss Belvedere by a member of the committee organizing the 2007 event, the car was unearthed on June 14, 2007, during the state's centennial celebration and publicly unveiled the next day. Reflecting the Cold War tensions endemic in late 1950s America, the enclosure – built of poured in place concrete and sprayed with pneumatically applied gunite – was advertised as having been built to withstand a nuclear attack. However, the vault was breached by long term water intrusion, that submerged the entire vehicle, causing significant cosmetic and structural damage.

Efforts were made to stabilize Miss Belvederes condition, including essential suspension repairs, with the hope of placing her in a museum. After being stored for ten years, the car was accepted by the Historic Auto Attractions Museum in Roscoe, Illinois, and shipped in June 2017.

 History 
Burial (1957)

As part of the city of Tulsa's "Tulsarama" Golden Jubilee Week festivities celebrating Oklahoma's 50th year of statehood, it was decided to bury, in an underground vault, a new desert gold and sand dune white two-tone 1957 Plymouth Belvedere sport coupe. Also, along with the unnamed vehicle, other contemporary items were placed inside the vault as a time capsule for the people of the year 2007. It was felt that these items, when the vault was opened in 2007, would help acquaint future generations with life in 1957. When asked why the 1957 Plymouth Belvedere was chosen, event chairman Lewis Roberts Sr. was quoted that the car represented "an advanced product of American industrial ingenuity with the kind of lasting appeal that will still be in style 50 years from now." The car was donated by Plymouth Motors and a group of Plymouth car dealers from the Tulsa area.  Ultimately, the car was intended to be a prize awarded upon the vehicle's unearthing for the individual, or their descendant, who came nearest to guessing Tulsa's population in 2007. An additional prize of the value of a savings account, started with a $100.00 deposit in 1957, would also be awarded to the winner of the car. The contest was advertised with the slogan “Suddenly It’s 2,007” which was a variation of the 1957 Plymouth advertising campaign “Suddenly, it’s 1960 ...”. A second matching Plymouth Belvedere had been awarded, in a separate contest, a few days prior to Miss Belvedere'''s burial in the vault.

A large number of items were placed inside the trunk and glove box of Miss Belvedere. A partial list of items included a five-gallon container of gasoline, a case of motor oil, a case of Schlitz beer and items that were considered typical contents of a woman's purse, which included a bottle of tranquilizers, an unpaid parking ticket, 14 bobby pins, a compact, cigarettes and matches, two combs, a tube of lipstick, a package of gum, a plastic rain hat, pocket facial tissues, and $2.73 in bills and coins. Some of the items placed in the sealed steel capsule, welded shut and painted white, behind the car included a 48-star American flag, letters from various state and city officials and documentation for a savings account valued at $100 in 1957 along with entry postcards for the contest regarding the city's population in 2007.

A  by  underground poured in place concrete vault, with pneumatically applied gunite on its interior walls, had been prepared in the courthouse lawn with the top of the vault being three feet below the surface. Miss Belvedere was placed on a steel skid with her tires off the ground and the vehicle was lowered into the vault a number of times for publicity photos to be taken. After being lowered for the final time, the car was coated in a cosmoline like substance and was then wrapped in layers of sealed plastic. It was hoped that these actions would protect the car from moisture that might seep in. Concrete beams were set on top of the vault as a lid and then the beams were sprayed with gunite to seal the vault. Following the replacement of dirt and sod, a bronze marker, donated by a local cemetery, was placed to mark the spot. In 1997 there were some people expecting that the car would be unearthed due to the inscription on the marker which read "Golden Jubilee, Inc. Time Capsule with 1957 Plymouth To Be Opened in 2007 by Centennial Committee." It was mistakenly thought that the "Centennial Committee" referred to the group that was organizing the centennial celebration for the City of Tulsa in 1997.

Unearthing (2007)
In the years leading up to the anticipated opening of the vault, speculation abounded on the car's condition. Many felt that the car would be found in near pristine condition, but others expressed concern that moisture may have entered the vault causing moderate to extensive damage. It was not known if a nearby construction accident in 1973, in which a water main was damaged flooding the area, had any effect on the vault. After eighteen months of preparations by a group of volunteers, the vault was opened on June 14, 2007, during the state's centennial celebration. In press interviews, the 2007 organizing committee co-chairman Sharon King Davis acknowledged that she was the person who had named the vehicle  Miss Belvedere. However, the official website used leading up to the event did not feature the Miss Belvedere name. Interest in the event became international, with news organizations and interested people from abroad making plans to attend the event. Organizers had made arrangements with vehicle customizer Boyd Coddington, under a sponsorship arrangement with Amsoil, to use the sponsor's products in starting the car when it was removed from the vault. A local crane service had volunteered to lift the car out of the vault, and customized lifting equipment was fabricated for the job. An identical model Plymouth Belvedere was found and test lifts were made with the vehicle to ascertain the center of gravity for the lift. 

It also appeared that at some point the vault had been filled with water to a point just below the lid, covering the entire vehicle. In line with the Cold War realities of late 1950s America, the concrete enclosure was advertised as having been built to withstand a nuclear attack; however, it was not airtight, which allowed water to seep in. While the car was still wrapped in the ripped plastic covering, the car's exact condition was unknown. Previous speculation that water entering the vault may have caused significant damage to the vehicle was soon realized. A hazmat team had been brought in to assess any danger to the public when the vault was opened. Their testing revealed only hydrocarbons that were from the oil and gas that was buried with the vehicle.

The standing water was then pumped out of the vault and preparations were made to lift the car. Miss Belvedere was lifted from the vault and transported to the Tulsa Convention Center, where it was publicly unveiled on June 15, 2007. Boyd Coddington and his team were on hand to evaluate and start the car, but that proved impossible due to the car's condition. Upon inspection, it was found that the keys were corroded in the ignition. The tires were able to be inflated, and signatures of those who were on hand when the car was buried were still legible. Items buried with the vehicle in a sealed steel container emerged unscathed, but anything buried unprotected in the vehicle was heavily damaged or had deteriorated completely from the water intrusion. Among the items recovered from the trunk were rusty cans from a case of Schlitz beer and the  containers of gasoline and oil that was intended to be used for starting the car in 2007 if gasoline was no longer the fuel of choice for motor vehicles. The glass containers of gasoline and motor oil that were buried with the car were taken to the University of Oklahoma for testing and research. Following the unveiling ceremony, Miss Belvedere was temporarily placed on display at a local car dealership. 

The car was intended to be a prize awarded to the individual, or his or her descendant, who came nearest to guessing Tulsa's population in 2007. Out of 812 entries, the winning entrant was Raymond Humbertson, whose guess of 384,743 was closest to the actual figure of 382,457. It was found out that Raymond Humbertson had died in 1979, his wife in 1988, and the couple did not have any children. The car and the savings account—the value of which had grown to $666.85 from its original 1957 value of $100—were awarded to Humbertson's surviving sisters and nephew. Humbertson's relatives expressed surprise, because he had never lived in the Tulsa area; they were unsure of the circumstances leading him to enter the contest in 1957.

Stabilization efforts

In November 2007, Humbertson's relatives shipped the car to the New Jersey facilities of Ultra One, a restoration firm whose specialty product is a de-rusting solution which is designed to remove only rust while leaving the underlying metal, paint and decals intact. It was estimated that the stabilization project would take roughly six months or perhaps longer, given the difficulty of removing the mix of cosmoline and mud that were caked on the car. While there were no plans to disassemble or restore the vehicle, there were discussions regarding the return of the drivetrain and electrical system to operating condition.

In May 2009, when Dwight Foster of Ultra One participated in a podcast and provided details and new pictures, it was shown that Miss Belvederes restoration was still underway, with the car's exterior having been virtually freed of its rust and mud concretions.  Foster noted that he had purchased a 1957 Plymouth Savoy as a donor car to replace needed parts to keep Miss Belvedere from further deterioration, and the initial offer was a promotional stunt for his business. It was hoped that the frame and trunk under body would be used from the Savoy to replace the weakened original parts.  However, after investing more than $15,000, and after evaluating the condition of the frame and body, Mr. Foster halted further restoration efforts. The car stayed in Ultra One's warehouse for ten years, while a permanent display location was sought.

 Search for a permanent site  
After the stabilization work on Miss Belvedere was completed, the city of Tulsa was approached and offered the chance to have the car returned as part of a permanent display. The offer was refused by the city, as was an offer to the Smithsonian Museum. Foster stated that he hoped to find another museum that would accept Miss Belvedere for display.

In 2015, Dwight Foster announced that Miss Belvedere'' would be permanently displayed at the Historic Auto Attractions Museum in Roscoe, Illinois. Wayne Lensing, owner of the Historic Auto Attractions Museum, stated that he hoped the exhibit would be open by 2016. In June 2017, it was reported that the car had been shipped to the museum, where the owner worked on preparing the exhibit and getting the car and facility ready to display. On June 9, 2020, the display opened for public viewing.

References

External links
Buried Plymouth (includes 1957 archive file footage of the event)
The raising of the buried Plymouth
The Forward Look Network's Miss Belvedere Discussion
Article in TulsaWorld about the current state of ‘‘Miss Belvedere’’ and the efforts to donate it to the Smithsonian dated June 15, 2012

History of Tulsa, Oklahoma
Plymouth vehicles
Time capsules
Individual cars